The Cepturaru is a left tributary of the river Olt in Romania. It flows into the Olt in Valea lui Alb.

References

Rivers of Olt County
Rivers of Romania